
Year 660 (DCLX) was a leap year starting on Wednesday (link will display the full calendar) of the Julian calendar. The denomination 660 for this year has been used since the early medieval period, when the Anno Domini calendar era became the prevalent method in Europe for naming years.

Events 
 By place 
 Byzantine Empire 
 Emperor Constans II is paranoid about the ambitions of his younger brother, Theodosius, and has him murdered. Having attracted the hatred of the citizens of Constantinople, Constans decides to leave the Byzantine capital and moves to Syracuse (Sicily).

 Europe 
 The March of the Slavs, centred north of modern Klagenfurt, preserves independence and is first mentioned in historical sources, known as Carantania (Austria).
 Felix, patrician of Toulouse, assumes the titles of Duke of Vasconia and Aquitaine. He is formally a vassal of the Franks, but rules "de facto" independently.

 Britain 
 King Cenwalh of Wessex becomes dissatisfied with his local bishop, Agilbert of Dorchester, as he does not speak West-Saxon. Cenwalh splits the episcopal see of Wessex in two. Wine becomes the first bishop of Winchester, by the Saxons called Wintancestir. Agilbert resigns in protest and travels north to Northumbria.
 King Sigeberht II of Essex is murdered by his brothers, Swithelm and Swithfrith, and other kinsmen for being "too ready to pardon his enemies"; that is to say, the Christians. Swithelm becomes king of Essex, with Swithfrith as joint-monarch for a period (approximate date).
 King Conall Crandomna of Dál Riata (modern Scotland) dies, and is succeeded by his nephew Domangart mac Domnaill.

 Korea 
 July 9 – Battle of Hwangsanbeol: Sillan forces (50,000 men) led by general Kim Yu-shin defeat the army of Baekje at Nonsan. During the fighting general Gyebaek dies at the hand of the Sillan invaders.
 Baekje in southwestern Korea is conquered by an alliance of the Tang Dynasty and Silla, led by general Su Dingfang and King Munmu of Silla. The Japanese envoys detained in Chang'an are paroled.
 Emperor Gao Zong suffers from an illness (possibly slow-poisoning). His wife Wu Zetian starts to rule the Chinese Empire.

 Japan 
 Prince Naka no Ōe no Ōji of Japan makes a Japanese clock for the first time at Asuka, by which he causes the people to know the hours.
 After the fall of Sabi to the forces of Silla, the Yamato government sends envoys directly to the Chinese court for the first time
 The Baekje–Tang War begins, involving Yamato forces in support of the kingdoms of Baekje and Goguryeo
 Japanese forces, under command of Abe no Hirafu, massacre the Mishihase people in Hokkaido 
 The capital of Japan moves from Asuka, Yamato (Okamoto Palace or Nochi no Asuka-Okamoto-no-miya) to Asakura, FukuokaPonsonby-Fane, Richard. (1915). The Imperial Family of Japan, p. 24.

Births 
 Acca, bishop of Hexham (approximate date)
 Genmei, empress of Japan (d. 721)
 John of Dailam, Syrian monk (d. 738)
 Leudwinus, Frankish bishop (approximate date)
 Rupert, bishop of Salzburg (approximate date)
 Yamanoue no Okura, Japanese poet (d. 733)

Deaths 

 December 1 – Eligius, bishop and saint
 Boggis, Duke of Aquitaine (approximate date)
 Conall Crandomna, king of Dál Riata (Scotland)
 Gyebaek, general of Baekje (Korea)
 Magnus, bishop and governor of Avignon
 Sigebert III, king of Austrasia (or 656)
 Sigeberht II, king of Essex (approximate date)
 Xin Maojiang, chancellor of the Tang Dynasty

References

Sources